Kethanakonda is a village in NTR district of the Indian state of Andhra Pradesh. It is located in Ibrahimpatnam mandal under Vijayawada revenue division.

References

Villages in NTR district